Magique (Magic) is the Olympic mascot of the 1992 Winter Olympics in Albertville and is a little imp in the shape of a star and a cube. It is created by Philippe Mairesse and was presented in 1989. His star shape symbolizes dreams and imagination. His colors come from the French flag, with a red hat and a blue costume. Magique was the first mascot that was not an animal since the 1976 Winter Olympics. Several studies, financed by the Organising Committee (OCOG), were conducted to find a name for the mascot, but in the end none was chosen. However, on re-reading his brief, his creator realised that the word “magique” appeared several times and the OCOG decided to name the mascot accordingly.

The mascot had a pedagogical role: with the aim of informing the 7,924 Games volunteers, the OCOG opted for a computer-aided teaching programme. Magique appeared in the various teaching modules and games.

Originally, the chosen mascot was a mountain goat, created by illustrator Michel Pirus. This idea gave way to the star-shaped imp two years before the start of the Games.

Notes

1992 Winter Olympics
Olympic mascots
Fictional goblins
French mascots
French culture
Fictional French people